Babići may refer to the following places:

Babići (Gračanica), village in the municipality of Gračanica, Bosnia and Herzegovina
Babići, Kaštelir-Labinci, Croatia
Babići (Umag), Croatia
Babići, a place in Plužine, Montenegro

See also
Babiči, Slovenia